Vindhya may refer to:

 Vindhya Range in central India
 Vindhya (actress), Indian actress
 Lethe vindhya, the black forester, a butterfly found in India and Indochina
 Vindhya Pradesh, a former state of India